Anacanthoderma is a genus of gastrotrichs belonging to the family Dasydytidae.

Species:

Anacanthoderma paucisetosum 
Anacanthoderma punctatum

References

Gastrotricha